Studley Oldham Burroughs was an illustrator and cartoonist. Burroughs drew the  comic strip Self Control is a Wonderful Virtue for the Los Angeles Tribune's Sunday Fiction Magazine in 1916. In 1931, he began composing covers for his uncle Edgar Rice Burroughs' new publishing company ERB Inc., including Tarzan the Invincible, Jungle Girl, and Apache Devil.

References

1892 births
1949 deaths